The Wasit governorate election of 2013 was held on 20 April 2013 alongside elections for all other governorates outside Iraqi Kurdistan, Kirkuk, Anbar, and Nineveh.

Results 

|- style="background-color:#E9E9E9"
!align="left" colspan=2 valign=top|Party/Coalition!! Allied national parties !! Leader !!Seats !! Change !!Votes
|-
|bgcolor="#FF0000"|
|align=left|State of Law Coalition || ||Nouri Al-Maliki|| 7 || || 96,664
|-
|bgcolor="#009933"|
|align=left|Citizens Alliance ||align=left| || Ammar al-Hakim|| 7 || || 86,403
|-
|bgcolor="#000000"|
|align=left|Liberal Coalition|| ||Muqtada al-Sadr|| 5 || || 63,584
|-
|
|align=left|Loyal Hands’ Gathering || align=left| || align=left| || 2 || || 29,969
|-
|
|align=left|Social Justice State || align=left| || align=left| || 2 || || 28,446
|-
|bgcolor="#F6BE22"|
|align=left|Iraq’s Benevolence and Generosity List || || || 1 || || 13,678
|-
|bgcolor="#098DCD"|
|align=left|Al Iraqia National and United Coalition || || align=left|Ayad Allawi || 1 || || 13,055
|-
|
|align=left|Equitable State Movement || align=left| || align=left| || 1 || || 8,447
|-
|
|align=left|Civil Democratic Alliance in Wasit || || || 1 || || 8,420
|-
|
|align=left|Feylis Kurds Brotherhood List || || || 1 || || 2,212
|-
|
|align=left|Feylis Kurds Pledge Bloc || || || || || 1,618
|-
|
|align=left|Iraq Cadres Bloc || || || || || 1,563
|-
|
|align=left|Law Advocate Knights' Bloc || || || || || 1,399
|-
|
|align=left|Baqer Jasem Al Hassan || || || || || 817
|-
|
|align=left|Ismail Mohamed Hassan (Abe Know) || || || || || 402
|-
|colspan=2 align=left| Total || || || 28 || || 356,677
|-
|colspan=7 align=left|Sources: al-Sumaria - Wasit Coalitions, ISW, IHEC

References 

2013 Iraqi governorate elections